The 2015 Vietnam Open Grand Prix was the eleventh grand prix gold and grand prix tournament of the 2015 BWF Grand Prix and Grand Prix Gold. The tournament was held at the Nguyen Du Stadium in Ho Chi Minh City, Vietnam on 24–30 August 2015 and had a total purse of $50,000.

Men's singles

Seeds

  Tommy Sugiarto (champion)
  Lee Hyun-il (final)
  Xue Song (first round)
  Ajay Jayaram (second round)
  B. Sai Praneeth (second round)
  Lee Dong-keun (third round)
  Nguyễn Tiến Minh (third round)
  Jonatan Christie (second round)
  Andre Kurniawan Tedjono (first round)
  Chong Wei Feng (Semi final)
  Zulfadli Zulkiffli (second round)
  Vladimir Malkov (first round)
  R. M. V. Gurusaidutt (second round)
  Derek Wong Zi Liang (first round)
  Petr Koukal (second round)
  Wang Tzu-wei (third round)

Finals

Top half

Section 1

Section 2

Section 3

Section 4

Bottom half

Section 5

Section 6

Section 7

Section 8

Women's singles

Seeds

  Busanan Ongbumrungpan (second round)
  Beatriz Corrales (Walkover)
  Porntip Buranaprasertsuk (quarter-final)
  Kim Hyo-min (first round)
  Lindaweni Fanetri (withdrew)
  Iris Wang (withdrew)
  Hsu Ya-ching (first round)
  Rong Schafer (first round)

Finals

Top half

Section 1

Section 2

Bottom half

Section 3

Section 4

Men's doubles

Seeds

  Li Junhui /  Liu Yuchen (champion)
  Andrei Adistia / Hendra Aprida Gunawan (Semi final)
  P. J. Chopra / Akshay Dewalkar (second round)
  Markus Fernaldi Gideon / Kevin Sanjaya Sukamuljo (Semi final)
  Koo Kien Keat / Tan Boon Heong (quarter-final)
  Hoon Thien How / Lim Khim Wah (first round)
  Berry Angriawan / Rian Agung Saputro (second round)
  Fajar Alfian / Muhammad Rian Ardianto (quarter-final)

Finals

Top half

Section 1

Section 2

Bottom half

Section 3

Section 4

Women's doubles

Seeds

  Jwala Gutta /  Ashwini Ponnappa (withdrew)
  Ekaterina Bolotova / Evgeniya Kosetskaya (withdrew)
  Amelia Alicia Anscelly / Soong Fie Cho (second round)
  Jongkongphan Kittiharakul / Rawinda Prajongjai (champion)
  Vanessa Neo Yu Yan / Shinta Mulia Sari (withdrew)
  Shiho Tanaka / Koharu Yonemoto (first round)
  Pradnya Gadre / N. Sikki Reddy (withdrew)
  Suci Rizky Andini / Maretha Dea Giovani (final)

Finals

Top half

Section 1

Section 2

Bottom half

Section 3

Section 4

Mixed doubles

Seeds

  Riky Widianto /  Richi Puspita Dili (second round)
  Praveen Jordan / Debby Susanto (second round)
  Danny Bawa Chrisnanta / Vanessa Neo Yu Yan (withdrew)
  Ronald Alexander / Melati Daeva Oktaviani (second round)
  Huang Kaixiang / Huang Dongping (champion)
  Andrei Adistia / Vita Marissa (quarter-final)
  Alfian Eko Prasetya / Annisa Saufika (quarter-final)
  Vitalij Durkin / Nina Vislova (withdrew)

Finals

Top half

Section 1

Section 2

Bottom half

Section 3

Section 4

References

Vietnam Open (badminton)
BWF Grand Prix Gold and Grand Prix
2015 in Vietnamese sport
Vietnam Open Grand Prix